Frederick Schmidt is a British actor who has appeared in such films Mission: Impossible – Fallout (2018) and Angel Has Fallen (2019).

Career
In his early career, he starred in many British films. In Mission: Impossible – Fallout (2018), he appears alongside Tom Cruise. In Angel Has Fallen (2019), he plays Wade Jennings's assistant. He also stars in the TV series Supergirl, in which he plays Metallo.

Filmography

Film

Television

References

External links
 

1984 births
Living people
21st-century British male actors